From 1841 until 1872 Somerville was run by the Board of Selectmen, because up to that point Somerville was still incorporated as a town.  The Mayor is the current head of the municipal government in Somerville, Massachusetts.

Mayors of Somerville, Massachusetts

References

City of Somerville, Massachusetts (1901.), Municipal Manual of the City of Somerville, Massachusetts: published in the Year 1901, Somerville, MA: City of Somerville, Massachusetts, pages. 175–180; 189–204.

Somerville